Jerzy Ludyga (24 October 1950 – 1 March 1999) was a Polish footballer playing as a defender.

Career
Having started his career in his hometown Piekary Śląskie, his club career was spent in the second and first divisions. He scored 3 goals for Szombierki Bytom and another 3 for GKS Tychy in the top flight in 85 and 55 appearances respectively. He won the vice-championship with the latter in 1976, in what was the golden era for the club. He also had stint in the second tier with Motor Lublin. He played in one match for the Polish national team on 15 May 1977, in a 3:1 friendly win against Cyprus.

References

Bibliography

External links
 
 

1950 births
1999 deaths
Polish footballers
Poland international footballers
Szombierki Bytom players
Motor Lublin players
GKS Tychy players
Association football defenders
People from Piekary Śląskie
Sportspeople from Silesian Voivodeship